Sirocco is a light rail station on the Blue Line of the CTrain. Between 69 Street and 45 Street stations, it is located along the north side of 17th Ave SW. It was opened on December 10, 2012 as part of the West LRT extension, which goes from Sunalta to 69 Street.

Location and station layout 
The station is located along the north side of 17th Ave SW, just east of Costello Blvd, with westbound trains arriving from the north and eastbound trains arriving from the south.

The station includes a large park and ride just east of West Market Square, which can accommodate upwards of 450 vehicles.

History 
The station was built as a part of the West LRT extension of the Blue Line, which also included Sunalta, Shaganappi Point, Westbrook, 45 Street, and 69 Street. The station, along with the rest of the West LRT, opened for a preview service on December 8, 2012, and opened for revenue service on December 10, 2012.

In its first year of service, Sirocco served an average of 3,040 boardings per day.

References

CTrain stations
Railway stations in Canada opened in 2012